Namie Shimabukuro (born 10 June 1998) is a Japanese professional footballer who plays as a forward for WE League club Sanfrecce Hiroshima Regina.

Club career 
Shimabukuro made her WE League debut on 12 September 2021.

References 

1998 births
Living people
Association football people from Gunma Prefecture
Japanese women's footballers
Women's association football forwards
Sanfrecce Hiroshima Regina players
WE League players
Japanese people of Peruvian descent
Sportspeople of Peruvian descent